The A30 is a highway in Botswana that departs from the A3 road a few kilometers from Francistown, swoops around the Makgadikgadi Pans and joins the A3 again on the outskirts of Motopi.

References

Roads in Botswana